Tomasz Gielo (born 4 January 1993 in Szczecin) is a Polish professional basketball player for Merkezefendi Bld. Denizli Basket of the Turkish Basketball Super League (BSL). He also represents the Poland national basketball team internationally.

He started his career as a 15-year-old in the AZS Szczecin team. Later on, he continued his youth career in Zastal Zielona Góra, MKS Katarzynka Toruń, and SMS PZKosz Władysławowo.

In 2011, he went to the United States to play for the NCAA Liberty Flames of Liberty University. He was part of the 2012-2013 team who made the NCAA tournament. In 2015, he changed his college, energizing the ranks of the University of Mississippi. In his last year in the NCAA he recorded an average of 9.9 points and 4.3 rebounds.

Professional career
In the summer of 2016 he trained before the NBA draft with the Los Angeles Lakers and Philadelphia 76ers. He played in the 76ers summer league.

In August 2016, he signed a contract with the Spanish club Divina Seguros Joventut. In July 2018, he part ways with Divina Seguros Joventut.

On 15 July 2018, he signed a two-year deal with Iberostar Tenerife of the Liga ACB.

On 11 October 2020, he signed a one-month deal with MoraBanc Andorra of the Liga ACB. In 2021, Gielo signed with s.Oliver Würzburg, averaging 9.5 points and 3.1 rebounds per game.

On January 13, 2022, Gielo signed with Peristeri of the Greek Basket League. In 16 league games, he averaged 11.7 points, 3.3 rebounds, 1.1 assists and 0.8 steals, playing around 28 minutes per contest.

On August 15, 2022, he has signed with Merkezefendi Bld. Denizli Basket of the Turkish Basketball Super League (BSL).

References

1993 births
Living people
BC Andorra players
Polish expatriate basketball people in Andorra
CB Canarias players
Centers (basketball)
Joventut Badalona players
Liberty Flames basketball players
Liga ACB players
Merkezefendi Belediyesi Denizli Basket players
Ole Miss Rebels men's basketball players
Peristeri B.C. players
Polish expatriate basketball people in Germany
Polish expatriate basketball people in Greece
Polish expatriate basketball people in Spain
Polish expatriate basketball people in the United States
Polish men's basketball players
Power forwards (basketball)
S.Oliver Würzburg players